Catherine Ribeiro + Alpes were a French band formed in 1968. It consisted of singer Catherine Ribeiro and composer Patrice Moullet. The other members changed through every record. The two used to be in the band Catherine Ribeiro + 2Bis, but decided to change the name after their first record. While their style was mostly folk and psychedelic rock in their first years, they also included elements of avant-garde into their music. Their lyrics often dealt with political and social issues, and they were all written by Catherine Ribeiro, who is also notable for her very special singing style, chaotic and expressive. They disbanded in 1981.

Discography

Catherine Ribeiro + 2Bis 
Catherine Ribeiro + 2Bis (1969)

Catherine Ribeiro + Alpes
N°2 (1970)
Ame Debout (1971)
Paix (1972)
Le Rat Dèbile Et L'Homme Des Champs (1974)
Libertes (1975)
Le Temps De L'Autre (1977)
Passions (1979)
La Deboussole (1980)

French progressive rock groups
1968 establishments in France
Musical groups established in 1968